The Prigoana is a left tributary of the river Sebeș in Romania. It discharges into the Sebeș downstream of the Oașa Dam.

References

Rivers of Romania
Rivers of Alba County